John Gadsden was the twenty-eighth mayor of Charleston, South Carolina, serving two terms from 1827 to 1829.
John Gadsden was born on March 4, 1787, to Philip Gadsden (1761–1824) and Catherine (Edwards) Gadsden (1766–1816). He was a member of the South Carolina House of Representatives in 1819 and was the U.S. Attorney for South Carolina from 1820 to 1831. On September 3, 1827, Gadsden was elected to a second term as intendent of Charleston, defeating N.G. Cleary by a vote of 655 to 281. He died January 24, 1831, and he is buried at St. Philip's Church in Charleston, South Carolina.

References

Mayors of Charleston, South Carolina
Members of the South Carolina House of Representatives
1787 births
1831 deaths
19th-century American politicians